Tome Faisi (born 21 January 1982) is a Solomon Islands international footballer who plays as a defender. He played at the 2012 OFC Nations Cup.

References

1982 births
Living people
Solomon Islands footballers
Solomon Islands international footballers
Association football defenders
2012 OFC Nations Cup players